Ortley is a town in Roberts County, South Dakota, United States. The population was 50 according to the 2020 census.

History
Ortley was laid out in 1906; an early variant name was Anderson.

Geography
Ortley is located at  (45.332650, -97.197628).

Ortley has been assigned the ZIP code 57256 and the FIPS place code 47660.

Demographics

2010 census
As of the census of 2010, there were 65 people, 28 households, and 20 families residing in the town. The racial makeup of the town was 84.6% White, 12.3% Native American, and 3.1% from two or more races.

There were 28 households, of which 21.4% had children under the age of 18 living with them, 53.6% were married couples living together, 17.9% had a female householder with no husband present, and 28.6% were non-families. 25.0% of all households were made up of individuals, and 10.7% had someone living alone who was 65 years of age or older. The average household size was 2.32 and the average family size was 2.60.

The median age in the town was 48.6 years. 16.9% of residents were under the age of 18; 4.6% were between the ages of 18 and 24; 20.1% were from 25 to 44; 26.2% were from 45 to 64; and 32.3% were 65 years of age or older. The gender makeup of the town was 55.4% male and 44.6% female.

2000 census
As of the census of 2000, there were 54 people, 25 households, and 16 families residing in the town. The population density was 24.1 people per square mile (9.3/km2). There were 32 housing units at an average density of 14.3 per square mile (5.5/km2). The racial makeup of the town was 85.19% White and 14.81% Native American.

There were 25 households, out of which 28.0% had children under the age of 18 living with them, 56.0% were married couples living together, 4.0% had a female householder with no husband present, and 36.0% were non-families. 36.0% of all households were made up of individuals, and 16.0% had someone living alone who was 65 years of age or older. The average household size was 2.16 and the average family size was 2.81.

In the town, the population was spread out, with 20.4% under the age of 18, 11.1% from 18 to 24, 18.5% from 25 to 44, 27.8% from 45 to 64, and 22.2% who were 65 years of age or older. The median age was 45 years. For every 100 females, there were 100.0 males. For every 100 females age 18 and over, there were 95.5 males.

The median income for a household in the town was $23,438, and the median income for a family was $24,063. Males had a median income of $21,875 versus $21,250 for females. The per capita income for the town was $11,327. There were 10.5% of families and 12.9% of the population living below the poverty line, including 8.3% of under eighteens and 20.0% of those over 64.

References

Towns in Roberts County, South Dakota
Towns in South Dakota
Populated places established in 1906
1906 establishments in South Dakota